Anas Bach is a Moroccan professional footballer who plays as a defender for FUS Rabat.

References

Living people
1998 births
Moroccan footballers
Association football defenders
Morocco youth international footballers
Fath Union Sport players
2020 African Nations Championship players
Morocco A' international footballers